Shahu Khel, also spelt Shahukhel, is a town of Hangu District in the Khyber-Pakhtunkhwa province of Pakistan. It is located at 33°35'19N 71°7'21E with an altitude of 807 metres. Shahu Khel is located at the boundary of Orakzi Agency and thus attacked for so many times by the Orgakzi Tribes and killed people and destroyed properties.

Notable people
Ali Haidar, recipient of the Victoria Cross for actions during the Spring 1945 offensive in Italy.
Saidan Banda Hangu. He is the only Pathan (Belong from Bangash Tribe) who got Victoria Cross in the 2nd World War.

References

Populated places in Hangu District, Pakistan